Antonio Oscar "Tony" Garza Jr. (born July 7, 1959) is an American lawyer and diplomat who was the United States Ambassador to Mexico from 2002 to 2009 under President George W. Bush. In recognition of his work, Mexico bestowed on him the Águila Azteca, the highest award granted to foreigners, in 2009. Prior to his appointment as ambassador, Garza had served as Secretary of State of Texas from January 1995 to November 1997 and was also chairman of the Texas Railroad Commission.

Early life and education
Garza was born in Brownsville, Texas, the son of a gasoline station owner and the grandson of Mexican immigrants to the United States. Garza received his Bachelor of Business Administration from the University of Texas at Austin in 1980 and received his Doctor of Jurisprudence in 1983 from Southern Methodist University School of Law.

Career
After practicing as an attorney, Garza became a judge in Cameron County in 1988. He served as the Texas Secretary of State from January 1995 to November 1997 before later being elected as one of the three member board of the Texas Railroad Commission, where he served as chairman.

In 2002, he was appointed U.S. Ambassador to Mexico, a position he held until 2009. In 2009, the year he retired from the office, Garza received the Águila Azteca from Mexico in recognition of his work to strengthen the bonds between Mexico and the United States. This is the highest award that Mexico bestows on foreigners. Thereafter, he took a position as counsel with White & Case LLP and also as chairman of management consultancy firm Vianovo Ventures.

Personal life
Garza married María Asunción Aramburuzabala, the president of Tresalia Capital who had a personal fortune valued at $1.8 billion, according to one source. The couple divorced in May 2010. He subsequently married  Dr Liz Beightler.

References

External links

1959 births
Living people
Ambassadors of the United States to Mexico
Secretaries of State of Texas
County judges in Texas
Texas Republicans
American politicians of Mexican descent
Southern Methodist University alumni
Members of the Railroad Commission of Texas
Texas lawyers
Hispanic and Latino American diplomats
Saint Joseph Academy (Brownsville, Texas) alumni
People from Cameron, Texas
People from Cameron County, Texas